Amman is a 2020 Indian-Tamil language Supernatural drama television series, starring Pavithra Gowda, Amaljith, Nivisha and Surjith Ansary. The show is produced by Meraki Films Works and directed by Ravi Priyan and Parameshwaran. This show has Three Seasons. It premiered on 27 January 2020 and airs on Colors Tamil and digitally streams on Voot. The serial completed 1000 episodes on 1 January 2022. The series was ended with 1150 episodes on 1 July 2022.

Seasons

Story

Season 1
Shakthi, a village belle who is blessed with the power of foreseeing future. She is revered by the village for her unique ability. Eshwar, a doctor by profession, who lives in the same village, tries to drive a wedge between Shakthi and the villagers. Shakthi and Eshwar fall in love under unusual circumstances and the consequences of their love where Shakthi comes to now that her present family is not hers and sets out to find her real family. Will Shakthi reunite with her family and with Eshwar forms the rest of the story...

Season 2
Durga (Nivisha) is the daughter of a rich landlord. Shakthi (Parvathy) reaches the village to take the magical sword from the landlord's house. Meanwhile, Eashwar (Amaljith), who misunderstands that his girlfriend Shakthi is not alive, happens to meet Durga. Meanwhile, Durga develops feelings over Eashwar.

Cast

Main
 Pavithra Gowda as Sakthi (Season 1–3)
 a village belle who is blessed with the power of foreseeing future. She is revered by the village for her unique ability.
 Amaljith as Eshwar (Season 1–3)
 a doctor by profession, who lives in the same village, tries to drive a wedge between Shakti and the villagers.
 Nivisha as Durga (Season 2)
Surjith Ansary as Kishore (Season 2)

Supporting
Season 1

Season 2

Special appearances

Production

Casting
Actor Amaljith was cast in the male lead role as Eshwar. Kannada TV actress Pavithra Gowda was cast in the female lead role as Sakthi. The series marks the Tamil television debut for Amaljith and Pavithra Gowda. Nanditha Jennifer was selected to play the role of Saradha, who is the main antagonist in the show. While Nisha Jagadeeswaran, Shaliy Avinesh, Anita Nair, Rathan Ganapathy, Chandrika, Alexander and Shubha Raksha were also selected for pivotal roles in first season.

The production and airing of the show were halted indefinitely since 21 March 2020, due to the COVID-19 pandemic in India on 28 May 2020 resumed again to telecast all new episodes.

Vaigha, Maheshwari, Samyuktha Karthik, Manishajith and Rachitha Mahalakshmi were cast for guest roles in a few episodes.

While the second season was in pre-production, Amaljit and Pavithra Gowda, who played Easwar and Shakti in the first season, continued to star in the second series. Actress Nivisha was selected to play the role of Durga. Naresh Raj, He is making his debut on Tamil TV with this show.

Crossovers Episodes
 Amman had crossover episodes with Maangalya Sandhosham from 15 March 2021 to 27 March 2021.
 For the second time Amman had crossover episodes with Maangalya Sandhosham from 10 May 2021 to 10 September 2021.

References

External links 

Colors Tamil original programming
Tamil-language mythology soap operas
2020s Tamil-language television series
2020 Tamil-language television series debuts
Tamil-language television shows
Television shows set in Tamil Nadu
2022 Tamil-language television series endings